Ricardo "Ricky" M. De Ungria is a Filipino poet.

Personal
He graduated with a BA Literature, cum laude, degree from the De La Salle University and an MFA in creative writing from Washington University in St. Louis, United States in 1990 when he was awarded a Fulbright grant. He received writing residency fellowships at the Hawthornden Castle International Retreat for Writers in 1991 and the Bellagio Study of Conference Center in 1993. In 1999, he moved to Davao City to become the first dean of the College of Humanities and Social Sciences of the newly established University of the Philippines Mindanao campus. In the same year, he founded the Davao Writers Guild that eventually published the works of its members and held poetry readings in the different universities in the city; published DAGMAY, which was the first literary page in a local newspaper SunStar Davao in the island (it is now available online); and initiated the Davao Writing Workshops in 2005 that became an annual first-level training ground for young and beginning writers in the region and in the island. While serving as Chancellor of UP Mindanao, he also organized the Davao Colleges and Universities Network (DACUN) in 2001 and the Mindanao Studies Consortium Foundation, Inc. in 2003, both being a consortium of universities in the Davao region (DACUN) and in Mindanao (MSCFI). He also organized in 2004 the Mindanao Science and Technology Park Consortium Foundation, Inc. that was a consortium of academic institutions and government agencies in the Mintal area of the city.
He continues to be a fellow of the University of the Philippines Institute of Creative Writing in UP Diliman. He has served as a panelist in various writing workshops, notably the UP Diliman, Silliman University, Davao Writers Guild, and the Ateneo de Davao Writers workshops. He was also the head of the Committee on Literary Arts at the National Commission for Culture and the Arts (NCCA) where he became a Commissioner for the Arts in 2007-2010 and served as Festival Director of three Philippine International Arts Festivals held in February.

He is a founding member of Philippine Literary Arts Council (PLAC), and a member of the Unyon ng mga Manunulat ng Pilipinas (UMPIL), and Davao Writers Guild. For his achievements in literature and writing, he was awarded the Gawad Balagtas by the UMPIL in 1999 and the Patnubay ng Sining at Kalinangan (Literature) by the City of Manila in 2007. He was also UP Artist 1 from 2009 to 2011 and 2012 to the present time and the recipient of seven National Book Awards.

He teaches creative writing and literature in the Humanities Department of the College of Humanities and Social Sciences of U.P. Mindanao.

Works
Poetry
 R+A+D+I+O (1986)
 Decimal Places (1991)
 Voideville: Selected Poems, 1974–79 (1991)
 Nudes: Poems (1994)
 Body English (1996)
 Waking Ice: Poems (2000)
 Pidgin Levitations (2004)
 m'mry wire (2014)
Anthology (as editor)
 Luna Caledonia: Five Filipino Writers in Hawthornden Castle (1992)
 Passionate Patience: Ten Filipino Poets on the Writing of Their Poems (1995)
 Catfish Arriving in Little Schools (1996)
 The Likhaan Anthology of Poetry and Fiction (1996)
 The Likhaan Book of Poetry and Fiction 1999 (2001)
 The Likhaan Anthology of Philippine Literature in English from 1900 to the Present (2002)
 Fallen Cradle: Parents on the loss of a child (2006)
 Davao Harvest 2 (2008)
 The Best of Dagmay (2007–2009), (2010)
 Tala Mundi: The Collected Poems of Tita Agcaoili Lacambra Ayala (2011)

Honors and awards
 Academy of American Poets Prize
 Florida State University's State Street Poetry Contest
 Saint Louis Poetry Annual Contest
 Palanca Awards
 Manila Critics' Circle
 CCP Verse-Writing Contest
 Philippine Free Press Awards
 Fulbright Scholarship

References

20th-century Filipino poets
People from Manila
People from Davao City
Writers from Davao del Sur
De La Salle University alumni
Washington University in St. Louis alumni
21st-century Filipino poets
Filipino male poets